Fôrça Bruta is the seventh studio album by Brazilian singer-songwriter and guitarist Jorge Ben. It was recorded with the Trio Mocotó band and released by Philips Records in September 1970, during a time of political tension in dictatorial Brazil. Its title comes from the Portuguese term meaning "brute force".

The album introduced an acoustic samba-based music that is mellower, moodier, and less ornate than Ben's preceding work. Its largely unrehearsed, nighttime recording session found the singer improvising with Trio Mocotó's groove-oriented accompaniment while experimenting with unconventional rhythmic arrangements, musical techniques, and elements of soul, funk, and rock. Ben's lyrics explore themes of romantic passion, melancholy, sensuality, and – in a departure from the carefree sensibility of past releases – identity politics and elements of postmodernism, while featuring women as prominent characters.

A commercial and critical success, Fôrça Bruta established Ben as a leading artist in Brazil's Tropicália movement and pioneered a unique sound later known as samba rock. In 2007, Rolling Stone Brasil named it the 61st greatest Brazilian music record. That same year, the album was released for the first time in the United States by the specialty label Dusty Groove America, attracting further critical recognition.

Background 
In 1969, Jorge Ben re-signed to Philips Records after a four-year leave from the label due to creative differences and recorded his self-titled sixth album. It featured songs performed with Trio Mocotó as his backing band; Ben had met the vocal/percussion group while touring the nightclub circuit in São Paulo in the late 1960s. The band's members were Fritz Escovão (who played the cuíca), Nereu Gargalo (tambourine), and João Parahyba (drums and percussion). The album was a commercial comeback for Ben, and its success created a busy schedule for all four musicians. This "hectic" period for them led music critic John Bush to believe it may have resulted in a relaxed recording of samba soul for Fôrça Bruta.

Recording and production 

Ben regrouped with Trio Mocotó in 1970 to record the album. They held one nighttime session without rehearsing most of the songs beforehand. According to Parahyba, this was intended to give listeners an impression of the mood that developed as they played in the studio.

During the session, Ben first sang his vocal for a song before the accompanying instrumentation was recorded. He played the acoustic guitar for the instrumentals, and specifically the ten-string viola caipira for the songs "Aparece Aparecida" and "Mulher Brasileira". He also repurposed a tuning fork, a device traditionally used by musicians to maintain musical tuning among instruments; the singer instead stimulated it with his mouth to generate sounds that resembled a harmonica. For their part, Trio Mocotó attempted to develop a distinctive groove with a rhythm that would suit the rock or "iê-iê-iê" feel of Ben's guitar playing. The band played several percussion instruments, including the atabaque and bell plates. For "Charles Jr." and other tracks, Parahyba used the whistle of his sister's electric toy train as a horn instrument, breaking it in the process.

String and horn sections were recorded and included in the final mix but went uncredited in the album's packaging. It credited C.B.D. in Rio de Janeiro and Scatena in São Paulo as the recording locations for Fôrça Bruta, which was named after the Portuguese for the phrase "brute force". According to Robert Leaver of Amoeba Music's international records department, "one can see a sly irony" in the title, considering the heightened political tension in dictatorial Brazil at the time and the gentle quality of Ben's music for the album.

Musical style 

Fôrça Bruta has a pervasive sense of melancholy, according to Brazilian music scholar Pedro Alexandre Sanches. Songs that do not demonstrate this quality in their lyrics do so with their melodies, arrangements, and Ben's "devilish" guitar figures, with "Oba, Lá Vem Ela" and "Domênica Domingava" cited by Sanches as examples. He identifies each composition on the album as either a samba, samba lament, or "samba-banzo", which in his opinion gives the record an idiosyncratic sense of contrast. Greg Caz, a disc jockey specializing in Brazilian music, believes Fôrça Bruta possesses a melancholic, mysterious quality that departs from the carefree sensibility that had been the singer's trademark. He also observes a heightened progression in Ben's idiosyncratic guitar playing. Music journalist Jacob McKean finds it subtle and "stripped down" when compared to Ben's previous music, with his guitar more prominently featured, his vocals "more intimate", and a "somewhat crunchy, folksy tone" established by the opening songs "Oba, Lá Vem Ela" and "Zé Canjica".

Songs such as the cuíca-driven "O Telefone Tocou Novamente" and "Zé Canjica", featuring a drum cadence, experiment with unconventional percussion arrangements, resulting in rhythmic contrasts between Trio Mocotó and Ben's instruments. This rhythmic direction departs from his earlier music's innovative "chacatum, chacatum" beat, which had become popular and widely imitated by the time of the album. While still samba-based with hints of bossa nova, Fôrça Bruta adds understated funk and soul elements in the form of horn and string arrangements. Horn riffs are arranged in the style of Sérgio Mendes on "Pulo, Pulo", in the style of Stax Records on "O Telefone Tocou Novamente", and on the title track, which appropriates the groove of the 1968 Archie Bell & the Drells song "Tighten Up". On "Mulher Brasileira", a string section is heard playing swirling patterns around Escovão's cuíca, while the more uptempo rhythms of "Charles Jr." and "Pulo, Pulo" are given contrast by more relaxed string melodies.

Ben's singing provides further contrast and funk/soul qualities to the music. Along with his characteristic wails and croons, he exhibits a newfound raspy texture in his typically languid and nasal vocal. His singing also functions as an additional element of rhythm to some songs. According to Peter Margasak, Ben can be heard "reinforcing the rhythmic agility of his songs with pin-point phrasing, surprising intervallic leaps, and a plaintive kind of moan". On "Zé Canjica" and "Charles Jr.", he improvises phrases (such as "Comanchero" and "the mama mama, the mama say") as rhythmic accompaniment during otherwise instrumental sections of the songs. The singer also implores the name of "Comanche" occasionally on the album. As Parahyba explains, it is a nickname given to him by Ben, who originally recorded it as a joke on "Charles Jr." A different explanation came in the form of a lyric in Ben's 1971 song "Comanche": "My mother calls me / Comanche".

Lyrics and themes 

Women are central figures in Ben's lyrics throughout the album, especially in "Mulher Brasileira", "Terezinha", and "Domênica Domingava"; "Domênica" is a variation on Domingas, the surname of his wife and muse Maria. His preoccupation with female characters led Sanches to identify Fôrça Brutas predominant theme as Ben's "Dionysian body", referring to the philosophical concept of a body that can submit to passionate chaos and suffering before overcoming itself. Several of the songs deal with romantic disappointment. In "Zé Canjica", the narrator apologizes for being confused, sad, and moody while sending away a lover he feels he does not deserve. "O Telefone Tocou Novamente" expresses grief and pity over an angry lover ringing the phone of the narrator, who leaves to meet, only not to find her. During the song, Sanches observes a moment of catharsis by Ben, who raises his singing voice to an almost crying falsetto.

Ben's lyrics also appropriate thematic devices from the popular imagination. Sanches compares the verses of the caipira-influenced samba "Apareceu Aparecida" and "Pulo, Pulo" to songs from ciranda, a traditional Brazilian children's dance. In "Apareceu Aparecida" – which employs the "rolling stone" idiom – the narrator rediscovers the euphoric joy of living after his beloved has accepted him again; this leads Sanches to conclude that Ben sings of hedonism in a concentrated state.

Some songs feature expressions of political values. The nationalistic "Mulher Brasileira" celebrates Brazilian women regardless of their physical appearance and is cited by Brazilian journalist Gabriel Proiete de Souza as an early example of Ben's attempt to empower Afro-Brazilian women through his music. In Caz's opinion, the lyrics on Fôrça Bruta reveal deeper concerns than were found in the singer's previous recordings, shown most notably by "Charles Jr.", in which Ben explores his identity as an artist and as a black man. Brazilian music academic Rafael Lemos believes it demonstrates Ben's process of placing "black heritage into modernity", in the aftermath of slavery in Brazil and the continued marginalization of black people there. According to one translation of the lyrics, the narrator proclaims:

"Charles Jr." and other songs also use elements of postmodernism, such as self-reference, irony, and surrealism (as in the lyrics of "Pulo, Pulo"). Some of Fôrça Brutas characters and stories had appeared on Ben's earlier work, albeit in slightly different manifestations. On his 1969 album, "Charles" was depicted as a heroic Robin Hood-like figure of the country. The sensually primitive "Domingas" and "Teresa", also from the previous record, are rendered here as the more sophisticated "Domênica" and the irreverent "Terezinha", respectively. Ben sings the latter song in an exceptionally nasal voice interpreted by Sanches as an ironic caricature of música popular brasileira.

Release and reception 

Fôrça Bruta was released by Philips in September 1970. It was received favorably in Veja magazine, whose reviewer found it impressively rhythmic, full of musical surprises and suspense, and comparable to a comic book in the way familiar fantasies and characters are reformulated in strange yet delightful directions. Commercially, it was a top-10 chart success in Brazil and produced the hit singles "O Telefone Tocou Novamente" and "Mulher Brasileira". Its success established Ben as an integral artist in Brazil's Tropicália movement, led by fellow musicians Caetano Veloso and Gilberto Gil. The following year on his next album, Negro É Lindo, Ben delved further into the black identity politics of "Charles Jr." while retaining the melancholic musical quality of the previous record.

Fôrça Brutas fusion of Trio Mocotó's groove and Ben's more rockish guitar proved to be a distinctive feature of what critics and musicians later called samba rock. Its soul and funk elements, most prominent in the title track, helped earn the album a respected reputation among soul enthusiasts and rare-record collectors. In an interview for Guy Oseary's On the Record (2004), music entrepreneur and record collector Craig Kallman named Fôrça Bruta among his 15 favorite albums. Recording artist Beck also named it one of his favorite albums.

In 2007, the album was re-released by Dusty Groove America, a specialty label in Chicago that reissued rare funk, jazz, soul, and Brazilian music titles in partnership with Universal Music. The reissue marked the first time the album had seen release in the United States. Dusty Groove asked Chicago Reader critic Peter Margasak to write liner notes for the release, but he declined, citing in part the lack of American literature available on Ben. New York-based retailer Other Music later named it the fourth best reissue of 2007 and one of Ben's "deepest, most emotional albums". That same year, Fôrça Bruta was ranked 61st on Rolling Stone Brasils list of the 100 greatest Brazilian albums. In an essay accompanying the ranking, journalist Marcus Preto called it the singer's most melancholy album.

In a retrospective review for AllMusic, John Bush regarded Fôrça Bruta as one of Ben's best records and said it retained each musician's abilities over the course of "a wonderful acoustic groove that may have varied little but was all the better for its agreeable evenness". A reviewer for The Boston Globe said Ben's masterful performance of this music – "a fusion of bright samba and mellow soul" – still sounded original and essential nearly forty years after its recording; recommended even for non-Lusophones, it "transcends language and era with an organic vibe and breezy spontaneity". Nows Tim Perlich called it a "samba-soul heater", while Matthew Hickey from Turntable Kitchen deemed it "one of the most buoyantly textured and warmly melodic LPs ever recorded" and "Oba, Lá Vem Ela" among its "loveliest tunes". In Impose magazine, Jacob McKean highlighted the two opening tracks, finding "Zé Canjica" particularly attractive, and believed "Apareceu Aparecida" features the album's most appealing hook. He also found Trio Mocotó incomparable in their performance and the album elegant and exquisite overall, but added that Ben's nasally singing on "Terezinha" sounded unusual and the string section was given slightly too much emphasis on "Mulher Brasileira".

Less enthusiastic about the album was Stylus Magazines Mike Powell, who said it has "a kind of aesthetic gentility" that characterizes Brazilian music and polarizes its listeners. Powell added that, while his cavil may be silly, Fôrça Bruta remains "demure samba-rock laced with sliding strings, an agreeable, samey atmosphere, no strife on the horizon". According to Peter Shapiro, it may be "too dainty" or not adventurous enough for some listeners, lacking the stylistically eclectic abandon of other Tropicália music. But in his appraisal in The Wire, he judged the album to be "something of a minor masterpiece of textural contrast" and "a stone cold classic of Brazilian modernism", representative of the country's flair for "weaving beguiling syncretic music from practically any cloth". After discovering Ben's music in 2009, indie rock musician Andrew Bird wrote in a guest column for Time that Fôrça Bruta is a classic of "raw and soulful Tropicália" and observed in Ben's singing a "pleading quality" that projects a simultaneous sense of melancholy and delight. Alynda Segarra of Hurray for the Riff Raff also listened to it while making her band's 2017 album The Navigator, later citing Fôrça Brutas string arrangements as an influence on her "cinematic" approach to the album's lyrics.

Track listing 
All songs were composed by Jorge Ben.

Personnel
Credits are adapted from the album's liner notes.
 Jorge Ben – guitar, vocals

Trio Mocotó
 Fritz Escovão – cuíca
 Nereu Gargalo – percussion
 Jõao Parahyba – drums

Production
 Ari Carvalhaes – engineering
 Manoel Barenbein – production
 Chris Kalis – reissue production
 João Kibelkstis – engineering
 João Moreira – engineering

Charts

See also 

 1970s in Latin music
 Cinematic soul
 Jovem Guarda
 Music of Brazil
 Postmodern music

References

Bibliography

Further reading 
  An essay on Jorge Ben and Fôrça Bruta.
  An essay on the album's fifth track, "Pulo, Pulo".
  An essay on the first track, "Oba, Lá Vem Ela".

External links 
 

1970 albums
1970s in Latin music
Jorge Ben albums
Philips Records albums
Tropicália albums